Balthasar Glättli (born 12 February 1972) is a Swiss politician. He is a member of the National Council and, since June 2020, the president of the Green Party of Switzerland.

Political career 

Glättli joined the Green Party of Switzerland in 1991 and was elected as board member of the cantonal section in Zürich. Between 1998 and 2011 he represented Zürich-Seefeld in the parliament of the city of Zürich. He was elected to the National Council in the Swiss federal election in October 2011, and re-elected in October 2015. Since December 2013, he is President of the Green parliamentarian Group. From 2004 to 2008 Glättli was co-president of the cantonal GPS party, in co-operation with Marlies Bänziger.

On 20 June 2020, he was elected President of the Green Party, succeeding Regula Rytz.

Mandatory work 
Between 2010 and 2012 Glättli was in charge of the campaigns of the Swiss Union of Public Service Personnel, and currently he presides the Mieterverband Deutschschweiz, the Swiss German section of the union of tenants, and is vice-president of the Swiss national Mieterverband. He is a member of various NGO's like the Erklärung von Bern, Amnesty International Switzerland and Greenpeace Switzerland.

Personal life 
Balthasar Glättli graduated Maturität at the gymnasium in Wetzikon in 1991, and studied philosophy, linguistics and German literature at the University of Zurich. Glättli directs a web design and consulting company, is married to the Swiss politician Min Li Marti. They live with their daughter in Zürich-Wipkingen.

References

External links 

  
 

1972 births
Green Party of Switzerland politicians
Living people
Members of the National Council (Switzerland)
Politicians from Zürich
Swiss businesspeople
Swiss sociologists
University of Zurich alumni
20th-century Swiss politicians
21st-century Swiss politicians